The 42nd District of the Iowa House of Representatives in the state of Iowa.

Current elected officials
Kristin Sunde is the representative currently representing the district.

Past representatives
The district has previously been represented by:
 Russell L. Wyckoff, 1971–1973
 Reid W. Crawford, 1973–1981
 Ralph Rosenberg, 1981–1983
 Robert C. Arnould, 1983–1993
 Robert L. Rafferty, 1993–1995
 Jamie Van Fossen, 1995–2003
 Geri Huser, 2003–2011
 Kim Pearson, 2011–2013
 Peter Cownie, 2013–2019
 Kristin Sunde, 2019–present

References

042